Ectatosia moorei is a species of beetle in the family Cerambycidae. It was described by Pascoe in 1857. It is known from Java, Borneo and Sumatra.

References

Desmiphorini
Beetles described in 1857